Boruto: Naruto Next Generations is a Japanese anime series based on the manga series of the same name and is a spin-off of and sequel to Masashi Kishimoto's Naruto. It is produced by Pierrot and broadcast on TV Tokyo. The anime is directed by Masayuki Kōda (#105–281, #287–) and Noriyuki Abe (#282–286) and is written by Masaya Honda (#67–).

Boruto follows the exploits of Naruto Uzumaki's son Boruto and his comrades from the Hidden Leaf Village's ninja academy while finding a path to follow once they grow up. Despite being based on the manga, the anime explores original storylines and adaptations of the spin-off manga, Naruto: The Seventh Hokage and the Scarlet Spring; Boruto: Naruto the Movie; as well as the Naruto Shinden light novel series.

It premiered on TV Tokyo on April 5, 2017 and aired every Wednesday at 5:55 PM JST. Starting May 3, 2018 (episode 56) it aired every Thursday at 7:25 PM JST. Starting October 7, 2018 (episode 76) it now airs every Sunday at 5:30 PM JST. The series is also being released in DVDs. Viz Media licensed the series on March 23, 2017 to simulcast it on Hulu, and on Crunchyroll. On March 9, 2023, it was announced that the series is set to finish its first part with episode 293 on  March 26, 2023 and a second part was announced to be in development.

The opening theme song is "Kirarirari" by KANA-BOON (episodes 256–281) and "Shukuen" by ASIAN KUNG-FU GENERATION (episodes 282–293).

The ending theme song is "Bibōroku" by Lenny code fiction (episodes 256–268), "Ladder" by Anonymouz (episodes 269–281) and "Mata ne" by Humbreaders (episodes 282–293).


Episode list

Home releases

Japanese

Notes

References

Naruto episodes
Naruto lists